The 2008 IIHF InLine Hockey World Championship Division I Qualification tournament was held in the summer of 2007.

European qualifier

The 2007 European Qualification tournament was held in July 2007. The winner of this tournament, Bulgaria, advanced to the next level of the IIHF World Championship, which is the Division I tournament. Games were played at the Winter Palace of Sports in Sofia, Bulgaria.

Four participating teams were placed in one group. After playing a round-robin, the top team advances to the 2010 Division I tournament.

Standings

Fixtures

See also
2008 IIHF Inline Hockey World Championship
2008 IIHF InLine Hockey World Championship Division I

References

Iihf Inline Hockey World Championship Division I Qualification, 2008